Assisi Vidyaniketan Public School is a private Catholic primary and secondary school located in Kakkanad, Kochi in the state of Kerala, India. Popularly known as AVPS or Assisi, it was founded in June 1994.

See also

 Catholic Church in India
 Christianity in Odisha
 List of schools in Odisha
 List of Jesuit schools

References

External links
 School website

Christian schools in Kerala
Primary schools in Kerala
High schools and secondary schools in Kochi
Private schools in Kochi
Educational institutions established in 1994
1994 establishments in Kerala